Mare Australe  (Latin austrāle the "Southern Sea") is a lunar mare located in the southeastern hemisphere of the Moon. It is 997 kilometers in diameter, overlapping the near and far sides of the Moon.  Smooth, dark volcanic basalt lines the bottom of the mare. The Australe basin was formed in the Pre-Nectarian epoch, while the mare material inside formed in the Upper Imbrian epoch. The basin was almost completely destroyed by impacts prior to the appearance of the mare.

Unlike most of the lunar maria, Mare Australe has an uneven surface that is marked by a number of crater impacts. Examples of these include the craters Jenner and Lamb, which are flooded with basaltic lava much like many of the other crater features in this mare. The selenographic coordinates of this mare are 38.9° S, 93.0° E. The eastern half of the mare lies on the far side of the Moon, although it can be viewed in its entirety during periods of favorable libration.

Gallery

See also
Volcanism on the Moon

References

Australe
Australe
Australe